Anurag Sharma (born 6 February 1978) is an Indian television actor, originally from Prayagraj (Allahabad) who has acted mainly in Balaji Telefilms, known for having played Satish Deshpande in Zee TV's Pavitra Rishta and Param Khurana in Star Plus's Yeh Hai Mohabbatein. He appeared in Tere Liye as Sushant and Byaah Hamari Bahoo Ka as Rajan Gandhi. He appeared in episodes of Adaalat, Hum Ne Li Hai... Shapath and Yeh Hai Aashiqui. He is married with Nandini Gupta in 2020.

He also played the role of Maharana Pratap in Jodha Akbar and Elder Vanraj (King of Gujrat) in Dharti Ka Veer Yodha Prithviraj Chauhan.

Television

References

External links

Living people
Indian male television actors
Indian male soap opera actors
Place of birth missing (living people)
1978 births